Abbas ibn Muhammad was the 15th Da'i al-Mutlaq of Tayyibi Isma'ilism (died on 8 Shawwal al-Mukarram 779 AH/6 February 1378 AD, Hisne Af’ida, next to Al Maḩārīq, Sanaa, Hamdan, Yemen). He succeeded the 14th Dai Syedna Abdul Muttalib to the religious post and was the 10th Dai from the lineage of al-Waleed.

Life
Abbas ibn Muhammad became Da'i al-Mutlaq in 746 AH/1354 AD. His period of Dawat was from 746–779 AH/1354–1377 AD for about twenty-three years.

Syedna Abbas greatly stressed on obligatory prayers, those who showed laxity or negligence were deprived of his audience. He also ordered that no one be allowed to study Ta'awil until they were well versed in Zahir (Islam) of Sharia. 

He entrusted Syedna Abdallah Fakhr al-Din to administer the territory of Haraaz.

References

External links
The Ismaili, their history and doctrine by Farhad Daftary(Chapter -Mustalian Ismailism-p. 300-310)
The Uyun al-akhbar is the most complete text written by an Ismaili/Tayyibi/Dawoodi 19th Dai Sayyedna Idris bin Hasan on the history of the Ismaili community from its origins up to the 12th century CE period of the Fatimid caliphs al-Mustansir (d. 487/1094), the time of Musta‘lian rulers including al-Musta‘li (d. 495/1101) and al-Amir (d. 524/1130), and then the Tayyibi Ismaili community in Yemen.

Year of birth unknown
1378 deaths
Yemeni Ismailis
Tayyibi da'is
14th century in Yemen
14th-century Arabs
Banu al-Walid al-Anf
14th-century Ismailis
14th-century Islamic religious leaders